The Sudan Cup is the top knockout tournament of the Sudanese football. It was created in 1990.

Preliminaries 
Pegin 1 Agustus / End 31 May  
Round 32 ( Sudan Premier League Clubs and National League 1 Clubs)
Round 16
Quarter-Finals
Semi-finals
Finalist

Winners

Performance by club

External links
Sudan - List of Cup Winners, RSSSF.com

Football competitions in Sudan
National association football cups
Recurring sporting events established in 1963